The X Factor: Battle of the Stars is a UK celebrity special edition of The X Factor, which screened on ITV, started on 29 May 2006 and lasting for eight consecutive nights. Pop Idol was meant to air in its place as Celebrity Pop Idol but was stopped shortly before transmission, when ITV picked The X Factor over it.

Nine celebrity acts participated, singing live in front of the nation and facing the judges of the previous The X Factor series, Simon Cowell, Sharon Osbourne and Louis Walsh. Voting revenues were donated to the celebrities' chosen charities.

Cowell originally axed the format after its first airing, describing as "pointless", however, a revamped variation of the format aired in 2019, titled The X Factor: Celebrity with Cowell and Walsh reprising their roles as judges and Nicole Scherzinger replacing Osbourne on the panel as well as Dermot O'Leary taking over from Kate Thornton as host.

Contestants
Key:
 – Winner
 – Runner-up

Live shows

Results summary
Colour key

Live show details

Show 1 (29 May 2006)

Judges' votes to eliminate
Cowell: Gillian McKeith - backed his own act, Paul & Debbie.
Walsh: Paul & Debbie - backed his own act, Gillian McKeith.
Osbourne: Paul & Debbie - based on the final showdown performance.

Show 2 (30 May 2006)

Judges' votes to eliminate
Walsh: Michelle Marsh - backed his own act, Gillian McKeith.
Osbourne: Gillian McKeith - backed her own act, Michelle Marsh.
Cowell: Gillian McKeith - based on the final showdown performance.

Show 3 (31 May 2006)

Judges' votes to eliminate
Osbourne: Lucy Benjamin - backed her own act, Michelle Marsh.
Walsh: Michelle Marsh - backed his own act, Lucy Benjamin.
Cowell: Michelle Marsh - based on the final showdown performance.

Show 4 (1 June 2006)

Judges' votes to eliminate
Cowell: Nikki Sanderson - backed his own act, James & Rebecca.
Osbourne: James & Rebecca - backed her own act, Nikki Sanderson
Walsh: James & Rebecca - based on the final showdown performance.

Show 5 (2 June 2006)

Judges' votes to eliminate
Osbourne: The Chefs - backed her own act, Nikki Sanderson.
Cowell: Nikki Sanderson - backed his own act, The Chefs.
Walsh: Nikki Sanderson - based on the final showdown performance.

Show 6: Quarter-final (3 June 2006)

For the first time in the series, there was no bottom two. The act with the fewest votes was eliminated.

Show 7: Semi-final (4 June 2006)

Show 8: Final (5 June 2006)

All the contestants appeared to perform "I'd Like to Teach the World to Sing" and Shayne Ward performed "Stand by Me".

Axing and revival

It was reported on 26 August 2006 that Cowell had axed the show, describing it as "pointless" and adding "we are never going to do it again." However, Cowell later stated in an interview with The Sun on 30 November 2018 that he would consider reviving the show for a second series as a charity special.

The show's format was reported to return in 2019, along with a separate series for former contestants with a similar format, as the regular series is being put on hiatus due to declining ratings. On 7 July 2019, Walsh spoke about the return of the series, stating, "I go to Los Angeles on Tuesday, I go to Simon's house in Malibu, it's me Simon and Nicole [Scherzinger] and we're doing the celebrity one."

References

Battle of the Stars
ITV (TV network) original programming
2000s British music television series
2006 British television series debuts
2006 British television series endings
Television series by Fremantle (company)
United Kingdom Battle of the Stars
2000s British reality television series